Chivas may refer to:

Chivas Regal, a blended Scotch whisky produced by Chivas Brothers
C.D. Guadalajara, commonly known as Chivas, a Mexican men's association football club based in Guadalajara, Jalisco
C.D. Guadalajara (women), commonly known as Chivas, a women's Mexican association football club based in Guadalajara, Jalisco
Chivas Tijuana, a Mexican association football club based in Tijuana, Baja California from 1997 to 1999
Chivas USA (2005–2014), a former American soccer club from Los Angeles, California, founded and owned by the owner of C.D. Guadalajara
El Paso Patriots or Chivas El Paso Patriots, an American soccer club based in El Paso, Texas
Chivas Jazz Festival
"Chivas", a song by Kelly Clarkson from My December
Doug Chivas (1922–2004)

See also
Chiva (disambiguation)